Big Road Blues is an album by blues musician K. C. Douglas recorded in 1961 and released on the Bluesville label.

Track listing
 "Big Road Blues" (Tommy Johnson) – 3:25
 "Howling Blues" (Chester Burnett) – 2:48
 "Move to Kansas City" (Jim Jackson) – 2:29
 "Buck Dance" (Traditional) – 3:00
 "Tore Your Playhouse Down" (Traditional) – 3:19
 "Bottle Up and Go" (Tommy McClennan) – 4:00
 "Whiskey Headed Woman" (William Dupree) – 3:31
 "Catfish Blues" (K.C. Douglas) – 3:10
 "K.C.'s Blues" (Douglas) – 5:04
 "Canned Heat" (Johnson) – 3:52
 "Key to the Highway" (William Broonzy) – 4:10

Personnel

Performance
K. C. Douglas – guitar, vocals

Production
 Kenneth S. Goldstein, Chris Strachwitz – producer
 Chris Strachwitz – engineer

References

K. C. Douglas albums
1961 albums
Bluesville Records albums